The men's discus throw event at the 1996 World Junior Championships in Athletics was held in Sydney, Australia, at International Athletic Centre on 21 and 22 August.  A 2 kg (senior implement) discus was used.

Medalists

Results

Final
22 August

Qualifications
21 Aug

Group A

Group B

Participation
According to an unofficial count, 26 athletes from 21 countries participated in the event.

References

Discus throw
Discus throw at the World Athletics U20 Championships